CBTD may refer to:

CBTD-FM
Cheaper by the Dozen
Commercial Buildings Tax Deduction